The 1994–95 Logan Cup, known as the Lonrho Logan Cup for sponsorship reasons, was a first-class cricket competition held in Zimbabwe from 16 September 1994 – 26 March 1995. It was won by Mashonaland, who beat Mashonaland Under-24s in the final having finished top in the league stage of the competition.

Points table

Final

References

Logan Cup
1994 in Zimbabwean sport
Logan Cup
Logan Cup
Logan Cup
Logan Cup